The National Consensus Forces (NCF, Ij’maa) is a coalition of political parties in Sudan that opposed the rule of the National Congress Party, and was initially formed to stand against the NCP in the 2010 Sudanese elections. Farouk Abu Issa served as chairman from 2005 until his death in 2020.

Policies
The Popular Congress Party, the National Umma Party, and the Sudanese Communist Party later signed the Democratic Alternative Charter (DAC) on 4 July 2012, committing themselves to overthrowing the NCP through various peaceful political and popular means and establishing a civil and democratic state. The DAC was signed by 19 opposition parties. The NCF later outlined their plan for a transitional government to lead Sudan in the post-NCP phase. The NCF's plan involves the establishment of a parliament, a presidential council of six members representing six regions after restructuring the current federal system and an executive government of 20 ministers.

Member parties

Main parties

 Sudanese Communist Party led by Muhammad Mukhtar Al-Khatib
 Arab Socialist Ba'ath Party – Region of Sudan led by Ali Elraih El Sanhoory
 Arab Socialist Ba'ath Party – Organization of Sudan led by Al-Tijani Mustafa Yassin
 Popular Congress Party led by Ibrahim El Sanousi
 Sudanese Ba'ath Party led by Mohamed Ali Jadin
 National Umma Party led by Sadiq al-Mahdi
 Nasserist Democratic Unionist Party led by Gamal Abdunnasir Idris
 Unified Democratic Unionist Party led by Jala'a Ismail Al-azhari
 New Forces Democratic Movement (HAG) led by Halal Abdulhaleem
 Sudanese Congress Party led by Ibrahim al-Sheikh at the time of signing and by Omer al-Digair since around 2016

See also
 National Democratic Alliance - a previous opposition alliance in Sudan

References

2012 establishments in Sudan
Organisations of the Sudanese Revolution
Political opposition organizations
Political parties established in 2012
Political party alliances in Sudan
Sudanese democracy movements